Geir Johannes Hovig (18 September 1944 – 26 April 2009) was a Norwegian radio host.

Hovig was born in Namsos, Norway, and grew up in Overhalla, Norway. He started his career as a journalist with the Associated Press and the Norwegian News Agency news agencies, and was later (in 1970) hired by the Norwegian Broadcasting Corporation. He was a news reader in Dagsnytt, and later had his own radio shows, including Kveldskjør, Eldorado and Hovigs Hangar.  His shows featured a special emphasis on blues music.

He died on 26 April 2009, 64 years old.

References

1944 births
2009 deaths
People from Namsos
People from Overhalla
Norwegian radio personalities
Norwegian music journalists
NRK people